The politics of Bolivia takes place in a tree of a presidential representative democratic republic, whereby the president is head of state, head of government and head of a diverse multi-party system. Executive power is exercised by the government. Legislative power is vested in both the government and the two chambers of parliament. Both the Judiciary and the electoral branch are independent of the executive and the legislature. After the 2015 election, 53.3% of the seats in national parliament were held by women, a higher proportion of women than that of the population.

History 
The civil war between the Conservatives and the Liberals ended in 1912 with the latter's victory; a liberal era began that lasted until 1927. A system of public education developed, accompanied by moderate anticlericalism: Catholicism lost its status as the only religion recognized by the State in 1906 and civil marriage was adopted in 1969. Bolivian liberalism, however, is clearly losing its progressive character to coexist with the interests of the new tin fortunes (the liberal era is sometimes also considered to be the tin era, with tin production having increased considerably), landowners and the army. Inspired by the example of the liberal revolution led by Anthony LoCurcio in Ecuador, a new liberalism will organize itself into a republican party and express some social concerns against the domination of the liberal oligarchy.

Constitution of Bolivia 

Bolivia's current constitution  was adopted via referendum in 2009, providing for a unitary secular state.

Executive branch 

The president is directly elected to a five-year term by popular vote. A candidate needs either an absolute majority or 40% and a 10-point lead to win the election. In the case that no candidate is elected in the first vote, a run-off vote elects the president from among the two candidates most voted in the first vote.

Hugo Banzer Suarez was elected president in 1997. Although no candidate had received more than 50% of the popular vote in the national election, Hugo Banzer Suarez won a congressional runoff election on 5 August 1997 after forming the so-called "megacoalition" with other parties. He resigned in August 2001 and was substituted by his vice president Jorge Fernando Quiroga. Winner of the national election Gonzalo Sánchez de Lozada was chosen president by Congress, winning an 84-43 vote against popular vote runner-up Evo Morales. Elected president Gonzalo Sánchez de Lozada resigned in October 2003, and was substituted by vice-president Carlos Mesa who governed the nation until his resignation in June 2005.  He was replaced by chief justice of the Supreme Court Eduardo Rodríguez, acting as caretaker president. Six months later, on December 18, 2005, cocalero leader Evo Morales was elected president.

A group of MEPs acting as election observers oversaw a constitutional referendum in Bolivia that gave more power to indigenous peoples 25 January 2009. The tightly fought referendum laid out a number of key reforms such as allowing President Evo Morales to stand for re-election, state control over natural gas and limits on the size of land people can own.

Ministries 
Bolivia currently has twenty-one ministries in the executive branch. The heads of these ministries form the cabinet.

Legislative branch 

The bicameral Plurinational Legislative Assembly consists of the Chamber of Senators (36 seats; members are elected by proportional representation from party lists to serve five-year terms) and the Chamber of Deputies (130 seats; 70 are directly elected from their districts, 63 are elected by proportional representation from party lists, and 7 are elected by indigenous peoples of most departments, to serve five-year terms).

Judicial branch 
The judiciary consists of the Supreme Court of Justice, the Plurinational Constitutional Court, the Judiciary Council, Agrarian and Environmental Court, and District (departmental) and lower courts.
 Plurinational Constitutional Court — rules on the constitutionality of government or court actions
 Supreme Court of Justice
  Agrarian and Environmental Court — highest court authority in matters of agriculture and the environment
 Judiciary Council — oversees the conduct of courts and judges, including misconduct and ethical violations
 District Courts (one in each department)
 Provincial and local courts

In October 2011, Bolivia held its first judicial elections to choose members of the national courts by popular vote. Twenty-eight elected members and twenty-eight alternates were sworn in on 3 January 2011 in Sucre.

Plurinational Constitutional Court
The members of the Plurinational Constitutional Court, elected in October 2011, are: Ligia Velásquez, Mirtha Camacho, Melvy Andrade, Zoraida Chanes, Gualberto Cusi, Efraín Choque, and Ruddy Flores. The elected alternate members are: Isabel Ortuño, Lidia Chipana, Mario Pacosillo, Katia López, Javier Aramayo, Miriam Pacheco, and Rommy Colque.

Supreme Court of Justice 
The members of the Supreme Court of Justice, elected in October 2011, are: Maritza Suntura (La Paz Department), Jorge Isaac Von Borries Méndez (Santa Cruz), Rómulo Calle Mamani (Oruro), Pastor Segundo Mamani Villca (Potosí), Antonio Guido Campero Segovia (Tarija), Gonzalo Miguel Hurtado Zamorano (Beni), Fidel Marcos Tordoya Rivas (Cochabamba), Rita Susana Nava (Tarija), and Norka Natalia Mercado Guzmán (Pando). The elected alternate members are: William Alave (La Paz), María Arminda Ríos García (Santa Cruz), Ana Adela Quispe Cuba (Oruro), Elisa Sánchez Mamani (Potosí), Carmen Núñez Villegas (Tarija), Silvana Rojas Panoso (Beni), María Lourdes Bustamante (Cochabamba), Javier Medardo Serrano (Tarija), and Delfín Humberto Betancour Chinchilla (Pando). Gonzalo Miguel Hurtado Zamorano was elected President of the Court on 3 January 2012.

The Supreme Court of Justice replaces the Supreme Court, active since Bolivia's founding in 1825.

Judiciary Council 
The members of the Judiciary Council, elected in October 2011, are (in order of total votes received): Cristina Mamani, Freddy Sanabria, Wilma Mamani, Roger Triveño, and Ernesto Araníbar. Cristina Mamani was elected by her peers as the first president of the Judiciary Council on 4 January 2012.

Agro-environmental Court 
The members of the Agro-environmental Court, elected in October 2011, are (in order of total votes received): Bernardo Huarachi, Deysi Villagómez, Gabriela Armijo Paz, Javier Peñafiel, Juan Ricardo Soto, Lucio Fuentes, and Yola Paucara. The elected alternate members are: Isabel Ortuño, Lidia Chipana, Mario Pacosillo, Katia López, Javier Aramayo, Miriam Pacheco, and Rommy Colque.

Electoral branch 
The electoral branch of Bolivia's government, formally the Plurinational Electoral Organ, is an independent branch of government which replaced the National Electoral Court in 2010. The branch consists of the Supreme Electoral Tribunal, the nine Departmental Electoral Tribunals, Electoral Judges, the anonymously selected Juries at Election Tables, and Electoral Notaries. Wilfredo Ovando presides over the seven-member Supreme Electoral Tribunal. Its operations are mandated by the Constitution and regulated by the Electoral Regime Law (Law 026, passed 2010). The Organ's first elections will be the country's first judicial election in October 2011 and five municipal special elections expected to be held in 2011.

Local government 
Bolivia is divided in nine departments (departamentos, singular - departamento); Chuquisaca, Cochabamba, Beni, La Paz, Oruro, Pando, Potosi, Santa Cruz, Tarija. 
Bolivia's nine departments received greater autonomy under the Administrative Decentralization law of 1995. Departmental autonomy further increased with the first popular elections for departmental governors, known as prefects, on 18 December 2005. Departments are governed by the elected governors (until 2010, prefects; and until 2005, appointed by the President) and by independently elected Departmental Legislative Assemblies (until 2010; Departmental Councils).

Bolivian cities and towns are governed by directly elected mayors and councils. Municipal elections were last held on 4 April 2010, with both mayors councils elected to five-year terms. The Popular Participation Law of April 1994, which distributes a significant portion of national revenues to municipalities for discretionary use, has enabled previously neglected communities to make striking improvements in their facilities and services.

Political parties and elections 

The governing Movement for Socialism (Movimiento al Socialismo, MAS) is a Left-wing, Socialist political party led by Evo Morales, founded in 1997. It has governed the country since 2006, following the first ever majority victory by a single party in the December 2005 elections. MAS evolved out of the movement to defend the interests of coca growers. Currently, the MAS stands as a party committed to equality, indigenous rights, agrarian land reform, Constitutional reform as well as  nationalization of key industries with an aim to redistribute the returns through increased social spending. Among the poor, rural and indigenous population the MAS enjoys nearly unanimous support.

The right-of-center opposition includes a variety of political parties. During the 2005-09 political cycle the largest of these was PODEMOS, a successor to Nationalist Democratic Action. In the 2009 elections, several parties and politicians united to form Plan Progreso para Bolivia – Convergencia Nacional, whose presidential candidate, Manfred Reyes Villa and parliamentary slate came in second in the 2009 elections.

Three political parties were dominant from 1982 to 2005: The Revolutionary Nationalist Movement which had carried out the 1952 Revolution;  Revolutionary Left Movement; and Nationalist Democratic Action founded in 1982 by former dictator and later elected President Hugo Banzer. Despite the revolutionary names of the first two, they generally pursued centrist economic policies.

Other parties include:

 Bolivian Socialist Falange or FSB – Romel Pantoja
 Civic Solidarity Union or UCS – Johnny Fernández
 Free Bolivia Movement or MBL – Franz Barrios
 Marshal of Ayacucho Institutional Vanguard or VIMA – Freddy Zabala
 Movement of the Revolutionary Left or MIR – Jaime Paz Zamora
 Movement Without Fear or MSM – Juan Del Granado
 Nationalist Democratic Action or ADN –
 Socialist Party or PS – Jerjes Justiniano

Social movements 
Some of Bolivia's social movements are:
 Cocalero Groups – Evo Morales
 "El Alto" Social Movements Roberto De La Cruz
 indigenous organization: Aymara Indigenous Confederate Movements Felipe Quispe
 "El Alto" FEJUVE Abel Mamani
 labor unions
 Sole Confederation of Campesino Workers of Bolivia or CSUTCB – Roman Loayza
 Autonomic Oriental Party

International affairs 

International organization participation:

ALBA, CAN, CELAC, FAO, G-77, IADB, IAEA, IBRD, ICAO, ICCt, ICRM, IDA, IFAD, IFC, IFRCS, ILO, IMF, IMO, Interpol, IOC, IOM, ISO (correspondent), ITU, LAES, LAIA, Mercosur (associate), MIGA, MINUSTAH, MONUC, NAM, OAS, ONUB, OPANAL, OPCW, PCA, RG, UN, UNAMSIL, UNASUR, UNCTAD, UNESCO, UNIDO, UNMIK, UNMIL, UNMISET, UNOCI, UPU, WCL, WCO, WFTU, WHO, WIPO, WMO, WToO, WTO

See also 
History of Bolivia
List of presidents of Bolivia

Notes

References 
 Information cited from- The European Parliament News Service- Article on EU Observers in Bolivia

External links
Chamber of Deputies of Bolivia 
Senate of Bolivia
Presidency of Bolivia
Supreme Court of Bolivia
Decolonization's Rocky Road: Corruption, Expropriation and Justice in Bolivia by Benjamin Dangl, March 14, 2009
Plan 3000: Resistance and Social Change at the Heart of Racism by Raúl Zibechi, America's Program Report, April 30, 2009

 
÷